Matlaccohuatl was the third Tlatoani (ruler) of Ecatepec, a Nahua altepetl.

Biography 
He was a successor of the tlatoani Tezozomoc, who was a son of tlatoani Chimalpopoca, ruler of Tenochtitlan. 

His daughter was Teotlalco, wife of an tlatoani Moctezuma II and mother of Isabel Moctezuma.

The successor of Matlaccohuatl in Ecatepec altepetl was Chimalpilli II.

References

Tlatoque of Ecatepec
Nahua nobility
15th-century monarchs in North America
15th-century indigenous people of the Americas
15th century in the Aztec civilization
Nobility of the Americas